Robin William Kermode (born 9 July 1958), is an English actor, author and communications coach. He is best known for his role in Never the Twain, Ffizz, The Ruth Rendell Mysteries, Iron Lady, Wilde, the Norman Conquests, She Stoops to Conquer and Blithe Spirit.

Early life and education
Kermode was born in Nelson, Lancashire, he attended Abingdon School in Abingdon-on-Thames from 1969 until 1976. He was a keen actor at School, starring in Badger's Green, The Winslow Boy, Journey's End and as Lawrence of Arabia in Ross. He was also on the editorial board of The Abingdonian and was Head of School in 1976. He is the brother of tennis player Chris Kermode and grandson of Sir Derwent Kermode, a former British Ambassador to Indonesia and the Czech Republic.

He studied drama at the Central School of Speech and Drama from 1976 to 1979.

Career
Kermode started his career at theatre and received an early positive review in the Stage in 1979 when he played Mr Medley in The Man of Mode. In 1992, at the Oxford Playhouse he played an important role in Mark Dornford May's A Pig in a Poke.  He played Algy twice in the Importance of Being Earnest. In parallel with his stage career, Kermode has a long career in television. After some small roles, his career took off in the comedy series, Never the Twain, playing the son of one of the warring antique dealers, played by Donald Sinden, who falls in love with the daughter of the other, played by Windsor Davies. He gradually moved into a number of roles as police officers and began to work more in film. While working in television he appeared in leading soaps, including Emmerdale, Casualty and EastEnders.

His performance as John Major in The Iron Lady, building on his earlier portrayal of the politician Simon Hughes in the TV Movie, Wall of Silence, worked well in the film. He also appeared in Shiner, Julie and the Cadillacs and Wilde.

Filmography

Television 
 2012	Spy: Julian Sutton-Jones
 2010	Inspector Lewis: Interviewer
 2008	Harley Street: Consultant
 2007	Casualty 2007–2011: Philip Kemp / Peter Dibden – two episodes
 2007	The Inspector Lynley Mysteries: Tony Stevens
 2006	Emmerdale: DI Derek Carp
 2006	Angel Cake (TV movie): Paul
 2006	The Line of Beauty (TV mini-series): Pat Grayson
 2005	Mike Bassett: Manager: Dr. Moss (Mesmos)
 2005	Derailed (TV Movie): Andrew Grant
 2004	Coupling: Dr. Reynolds
 2004	Mile High: D.I. Hamilton
 2004	Wall of Silence (TV movie): MP Simon Hughes
 2003	M.I.T.: Murder Investigation Team (TV mini-series): Hospital Administrator
 2003	Jonathan Creek:	Mr. Jellcoe
 2002	Doctors 2002–2014: David Clarkwell, Peter Franks, Mike Everall, Clive Garrett – four episodes
 1998	The Bill 1998 and 2005: Pennhaligan / Robert Fellowes – three episodes
 1998	EastEnders: Det. Sgt. Kidman – three episodes
 1997	Birds of a Feather: Jonathan
 1996	The Ruth Rendell Mysteries 1996–1998: Sgt. Vine / Det. Sgt. Vine – five episodes
 1995	Pie in the Sky: Reverend Beaulieu
 1995	The Upper Hand: Gary
 1994	Men Behaving Badly: Ray – three episodes
 1989	French Fields 1989–90: Hugh Trendle – twelve episodes
 1988	Boon: Tommy Clayton
 1987	Ffizz 1987–1989: eleven episodes	
 1987	C.A.T.S. Eyes: Tom Byers
 1986	Dodger, Bonzo and the Rest: Shop assistant – two episodes
 1984	Shroud for a Nightingale (TV mini-series) – Arnold Dowson – three episodes
 1982	The Agatha Christie Hour: Jack Hartington
 1981	Never the Twain 1981–1983: David Peel – seventeen episodes
 1981	The Winter's Tale (TV Movie): Florizel

Films 
 2019: Close: Edward
2016: Mob Handed
 2011: The Iron Lady
 2000: Shiner
 1999: Julie and the Cadillacs
 1997: Wilde

See also
 List of Old Abingdonians

Bibliography

References

External links
Robin Kermode

1958 births
Living people
British male film actors
British male television actors
People educated at Abingdon School
Male actors from Lancashire
People from Nelson, Lancashire
20th-century British male actors
21st-century British male actors